Larnax psilophyta (also known as Deprea psilophyta) is a species of plant in the family Solanaceae. It is endemic to Ecuador. It was first described by Deanna Lieva in 2015.

References

Flora of Ecuador
psilophyta
Vulnerable plants
Taxonomy articles created by Polbot